The Associate (French:L'associé) is a 1979 comedy film directed by René Gainville and starring Michel Serrault, Claudine Auger and Catherine Alric. A co-production between France, Hungary and West Germany it is an adaptation of the 1928 novel The Partner by Jenaro Prieto. The film served as the inspiration for a 1996 American remake The Associate.

The film's sets were designed by the art director Sydney Bettex.

Cast
 Michel Serrault as Julien Pardot  
 Claudine Auger as Agnès Pardot  
 Catherine Alric as Alice Duphorin  
 Judith Magre as Mme. Brezol  
 Bernard Haller as Hellzer  
 Marco Perrin as Vauban  
 Jean Martin as Bastias  
 Fabrice Josso as Thierry Pardot  
 Henri Virlojeux as Urioste  
 Mathieu Carrière as Louis  
 Vadim Glowna as Marc Duphorin 
 Astrid Frank as Marie-Claude Hellzer  
 Daniel Prévost as Zephir  
 Jacques Legras as Inspector Pernais 
 Dominique Zardi as Le portier du ministère   
 Nathalie Courval as La femme au bébé  
 Jacques Dynam as Mathivet  
 Jean-Pierre Coffe as L'employé du museum d'histoire naturelle 
 Jean Leuvrais as Armand, le directeur  
 Patrice Laffont as Un présentateur TV 
 Christian Morin as L'animateur radio sur Europe 1  
 Jean-Claude Carrière as Un homme à la lecture du testament  
 Jean Degrave as André - le ministre de l'économie  
 Olga Valéry as La dame aux bijoux  
 Lionel Vitrant as Un agent de la sécurité d'Hellzer  
 Béatrice Radian 
 René Alié 
 Jacques Galland 
 Florence Brunold

References

Bibliography 
 Goble, Alan. The Complete Index to Literary Sources in Film. Walter de Gruyter, 1999.

External links 
 

1979 films
1979 comedy films
French comedy films
Hungarian comedy films
West German films
1970s French-language films
Films directed by René Gainville
Films based on Chilean novels
German comedy films
1970s French films
1970s German films